Saraswati yoga given rise to by the three natural benefic planets, namely, Mercury, Venus and Jupiter co-operating with each other is an auspicious yoga which is not rare in occurrence but when its participants are not strong merges with other yogas. The person born in Saraswati yoga besides being a very learned intelligent orator also becomes very fortunate, rich and famous.

This yoga is named after Saraswati, meaning the region abounding in pools and lakes, celestial or oracular voice, speech or the power of speech, learning and wisdom, who is the deity identified with education and knowledge.

Constitution and results

Saraswati yoga in Hindu astrology  is caused if Jupiter, Venus and Mercury occupy Lagna, 2nd, 4th, 5th, 7th, 9th, 10th and 11th either jointly or independently, Jupiter being in its own, exaltation or friendly sign, then the person becomes a poet, famous, learned in all sciences, skilled, rich, praised by all, and is blessed with a good wife and children.

Basic principles governing results

The results of Saraswati yoga basically depend upon the sign rising in the lagna and upon the bhavas owned and the signs occupied by the three yoga-causing natural benefics. Mars, Saturn, the Sun and the Moon in close proximity of the Sun (within the range of 72 degrees either side of the Sun), and Mercury associated with the malefics are treated as malefic planets. Venus, Jupiter, the full Moon and unafflicted Mercury are treated as benefic planets. Even though Mercury, Venus and Jupiter are not naisargika (natural) mutual friends, they become temporal friends by being in the 2nd, 3rd, 4th, 12th, 11th and 10th from each other and consequently co-operate with each other to confer good results. Any house that contains its lord, or from whom there are in the 5th, 9th, 2nd, 4th, 7th and 10th benefic planets and is not influenced by malefic planets gets strengthened. If the lord of the lagna is very strong, is in the varga of benefic planets, is exalted, is with a friendly planet, is in the navamsa belonging to itself, is associated with a benefic, is the lord of a kendra then one has best affluence, fame, wealth, grains and prosperity. Which ever be the house occupied by a planet if the lord of the sign is badly placed that house suffers. If Jupiter is located in a kendra and if the lord of the lagna is strong and occupies Parvatamsa the native is happy with wife, sons, friends and wealth; if Venus is in Devalokamsa and the lord of the lagna is in Gopuramsa and the lagna is aspected by a benfic the native is happy in middle and old age, and the good situation of the lagna, the 10th house and the Sun leads to good name and fame in life. When a person has no malefic planet in the kendras, in the trikonas and in the 8th house, and both the lagna-lord and Jupiter occupy the kendras then that person lives a life of hundred years free from disease. Even a single planet in its exaltation sign aspected by its friend makes one a wealthy ruler.

Application

In a Gemini lagna born nativity the conjunction of Mercury, Venus and Jupiter in the 5th house from the lagna will give rise to Saraswati yoga; the 4th and the 5th bhavas deal with education and the latter also deals with divine knowledge; good academic achievements are assured if the 5th house and its lord are strong very strong. Mercury, the lagna-lord, promotes the indications of the bhavas owned by other two planets and the bhava it occupies. The 5th house subjected to many benefic influences makes one intelligent and honest. Moreover, the conjunction of the lord of the lagna and of the 4th house with the lords of the 5th, the 7th and the 10th occurring in a trikona from the lagna-kendra is a Raja yoga. When lords of the kendras and the trikonas establish a mutual relationship a Raja yoga is produced. But, for any Raja yoga to produce more effective results the yoga-causing planets must form an immediate relationship with the lagna which is possible by occupying or aspecting the lagna or by associating with the lagna-lord but without being afflicted by malefic or by the lords of the trika-bhavas.

A mutual aspectual relationship between the lords of the lagna and 5th house has also been deemed to have given rise to the Saraswati yoga which yoga signifies great intellectual capability.

References

Yogas